Kazakhstan–Poland relations refer to bilateral relations between Kazakhstan and Poland. Kazakhstan has an embassy in Warsaw whilst Poland has an embassy in Astana. Both countries are members of the Organization for Security and Co-operation in Europe.


History

Poland and Kazakhstan have a shared history rooted in the mass deportation of ethnic Poles to the former Kazakh Soviet Socialist Republic of the Soviet Union.

Poland and Kazakhstan established formal diplomatic relations in 1992.

State visits
Poland President Andrzej Duda hosted Kazakh President Nursultan Nazarbayev in Poland in 2016 for the Polish - Kazakh Economic Forum.
Polish presidents Kwaśniewski and Kaczyński visited Kazakhstan in 1999  and 2007 respectively.

Economic relations
Trade turnover between the two countries exceeded $2.2 billion in 2014.  More than 200 Polish businesses are operating in Kazakhstan that have invested about $130 million in Kazakhstan operations.
Both countries' foreign trade agencies together established the Polish-Kazakh Intergovernmental Commission on Economic Cooperation to build commercial ties between businesses.

Transport links
LOT Polish Airlines operates a service from Warsaw to Astana.

Diplomacy

Republic of Kazakhstan
Warsaw (Embassy)

Republic of Poland
Astana (Embassy)

Ambassadors of Poland to Kazakhstan 
 Selim Khazbievich (2017 - present);
 Maciej Lang (2015-2016);
  Jacek Kluczkowski (2011-2015);
 Pavel Cheplyak (2007-2010);
 Vladislav Sokolovsky (Ambassador to Kazakhstan) (2004-2007);
 Zdzislav Nowicki (2000-2004);
 Marek Gawęcki (1994-2000).

See also
 Foreign relations of Kazakhstan
 Foreign relations of Poland
 Kazakhstan–European Union relations
 Poles in Kazakhstan

References

 
Poland
Bilateral relations of Poland